Armando García Méndez (born 28 December 1961) is a Mexican politician from the Social Democratic Party. From 2006 to 2009 he served as Deputy of the LX Legislature of the Mexican Congress representing the State of Mexico.

References

1961 births
Living people
Politicians from the State of Mexico
Social Democratic Party (Mexico) politicians
21st-century Mexican politicians
Deputies of the LX Legislature of Mexico
Members of the Chamber of Deputies (Mexico) for the State of Mexico